Luis Perea Hernández (born 25 August 1997) is a Spanish professional footballer who plays for Super League Greece club OFI, on loan from Leganes, as a central midfielder.

Club career
Perea was born in Alcalá de Henares, Madrid, and represented RSD Alcalá, Atlético Madrid and Rayo Vallecano. On 20 July 2016 he moved to CA Osasuna, being initially assigned to the reserves in Segunda División B. 

Perea made his senior debut on 21 August 2016, starting in a 2–0 away win against UD Somozas. He scored his first goal as a senior on 12 November, netting the first in a 4–2 home success over CD Lealtad.

Perea made his first team – and La Liga – debut on 5 April 2017, coming on as a second-half substitute for Fausto Tienza in a 1–0 away win against Deportivo Alavés. On 26 June of the following year, he signed a new three-year contract and was definitely promoted to the main squad in Segunda División.

Perea scored his first professional goal on 31 May 2019, scoring his team's third in a 3–2 away success over Córdoba CF, and helped the club in their top tier promotion with 15 appearances. The following 10 January, after featuring in only two league matches in the season, he was loaned to AD Alcorcón until June.

On 27 August 2020, Perea agreed to a five-year deal with CD Leganés, recently relegated to the second division.

Honours
Osasuna
Segunda División: 2018–19

References

External links

1997 births
Living people
People from Alcalá de Henares
Spanish footballers
Footballers from the Community of Madrid
Association football midfielders
La Liga players
Segunda División players
Segunda División B players
Tercera División players
Super League Greece players
CA Osasuna B players
CA Osasuna players
AD Alcorcón footballers
CD Leganés players
OFI Crete F.C. players
Spanish expatriate sportspeople in Greece
Spanish expatriate footballers